Whittle Peninsula is a peninsula, 5 nautical miles (9 km) long, terminating in Cape Kater and Radibosh Point to the north, and forming the west limit of Charcot Bay on Davis Coast, Graham Land. Surveyed by the Swedish Antarctic Expedition in December 1902. Named in 1977 by the United Kingdom Antarctic Place-Names Committee (UK-APC) after Sir Frank Whittle, Air Commodore, RAF, British pioneer of gas turbines for jet propulsion of aircraft from 1937.

Peninsulas of Graham Land
Davis Coast